Kumar Roy (1926–2010) was a Bengali theatre actor, director and playwright. In 1983 he won the Sangeet Natak Akademi Award. He was associated with the group Bohurupee. In 1989 he directed the re-creation of the classic play Nabanna (1948). He was the President of the PashchimBanga Natya Akademi (West Bengal State Theatre Academy) from 2006 till his death in 2010. Kumar Roy was also Professor of Drama at Rabindra Bharati University, Kolkata and Visiting Professor at Sangeet Bhavan, Visva-Bharati, Santiniketan.

Plays

Direction 
 Chauryananda  (by Tulsi Lahiri, 1956)
 Natyakarer Bipatti (by Ajit Ganguli, 1956)
 Geetaratna (by Chittaranjan Ghosh, 1956)
 Mrichchakatik (by Śūdraka, 1979)
 Galileo (by Bertolt Brecht, 1980)
 Rajdarshan (by Manoj Mitra, 1982)
 Aguner Pakhi (by Jean Anouilh, 1984)
 Malini (by Rabindranath Tagore, 1986)
 Mr. Kakatua (by Prashanta Deb, 1987)
 Yayati (by Girish Karnad, 1988)
 Kinu Kaharer Thetar (by Manoj Mitra, 1988)
 Nabanna (by Bijon Bhattacharya, 1989)
 Nindapanke (by Jean-Paul Sartre, 1991)
 Shyama (by Sisir Kumar Das, 1992)
 Akbar Birbal (by Sisir Kumar Das, 1993)
 Piriti Parama Nidhi (by Chittaranjan Ghosh, 1994)
 Sinduk (by Sisir Kumar Das, 1995)
 Muktadhara (by Rabindranath Tagore, 1996)
 Ek Din Ek Rat (by Sisir Kumar Das, 1997)
 Lal Kaner (Rabindranath Tagore's Rakta Karabi in Hindi 1986, under the Sangeet Kala Mandir)
 Itihaser Atmaa (by Ashim Chatterjee, 2000)
 Fulla Ketur Pala (2002)
 Nishiddha Thikana (2004)
 Deepa Danda (2005)
 Kaal Sandhya (by Buddhadeb Bosu 2008)

Acting 
 Rakta Karabi
 Putulkhela
 Bisarjan Raja
 Muktadhara
 Pagla Ghoda
 Mudrarakshas
 Baki Itihas
 Chop Adalat Cholche
 Mrichchaakatik
 Galileo
 Raj Darshan
 Dharmadharma
 Aguner Pakhi
 Malini
 Nabanna
 Nindapanke
 Ek Din Ek Raat

Awards 
 Sangeet Natak Akademi Award, (1983)
 Dinabandhu Puraskar (2003)
 National Theatre Award of India (1985)

References

External links 
 Article on Bohurupee and Kumar Roy in Bophurupee website

2010 deaths
1926 births
Bengali male actors
Bengali writers
Bengali theatre personalities
University of Calcutta alumni
People from Dinajpur District, Bangladesh
Dramatists and playwrights from West Bengal
Recipients of the Sangeet Natak Akademi Award